Smajl Suljević (born 15 July 1994) is a Swedish footballer who plays as a midfielder.

Club career
Suljević was born in Borlänge and began his career with Dalkurd FF before joining English club Stoke City in March 2011. However, he made little impact at Stoke, making a handful of reserve appearances and he soon returned to Dalkurd. In February 2015 Suljević joined Allsvenskan side GIF Sundsvall. He made his professional debut on 20 April 2015 in a 3–1 victory away at Örebro SK.

International career 
Suljević represented the Sweden U17 team once in 2009.

Personal life 
In Sundsvall, he was threatened with a knife and robbed.

References

External links

Smajl Suljević at Fotbolltransfers

1994 births
Living people
Swedish footballers
Swedish expatriate footballers
Swedish people of Bosniak descent
GIF Sundsvall players
Dalkurd FF players
Östersunds FK players
Syrianska FC players
Internacional de Madrid players
Jönköpings Södra IF players
Superettan players
Allsvenskan players
People from Borlänge Municipality
Association football midfielders
Swedish expatriate sportspeople in England
Swedish expatriate sportspeople in Spain
Expatriate footballers in England
Expatriate footballers in Spain
Sportspeople from Dalarna County